Plants:
 tobacco
 cannabis
 salvia divinorum
 opium
 datura and other Solanaceae (formerly smoked to treat asthma)
 possibly other plants (see the section below)

Substances (also not necessarily psychoactive plants soaked with them):
 methamphetamine
 crack cocaine
 black tar heroin
 phencyclidine (PCP)
 synthetic cannabinoids (see also: synthetic cannabis)
 dimethyltryptamine (DMT)
 5-MeO-DMT
 many others, including some prescription drugs
 Diazepam
 Clonazepam
 Alprazolam
 Secobarbital
 Pentobarbital
 Amobarbital
 Methaqualone
 Methylphenidate
 Amphetamine
 Adderall
Smoking
Smoke